Belchite is a municipality and town in the province of Zaragoza, Spain, about 40 km southeast of Zaragoza. It is the capital of Campo de Belchite comarca (administrative region) and is located in a plain surrounded by low hills, the highest of which is Lobo. The surrounding area is one of the most arid places of Aragon.

In 1122 Alfonso the Battler founded the Confraternity of Belchite to defend the frontier between the Christian kingdoms and al-Andalus. On June 15, 1809, during the Peninsular War French and Spanish forces fought in the Battle of María near the town. Between August 24 and September 7, 1937, during the Spanish Civil War, loyalist Spanish Republican forces fought General Franco's rebel forces in the Battle of Belchite in and around the town. After 1939, a new town was built near the ruins of the old one, which remain a ghost town as a memorial to the war.

The ruins of the old village have been used as filming locations in films including Terry Gilliam's 1988 film The Adventures of Baron Munchausen and Guillermo del Toro's Pan's Labyrinth. The ruins were also used in the opening scene of the 1983 ITV documentary The Spanish Civil War.

References

External links 

 Belchite visitor and historical information 

Municipalities in the Province of Zaragoza
Ghost towns in Spain
Former populated places in Spain